XF may refer to:

Television 
 The X Factor, a television music talent show franchise  
 The X Files, a sci-fi television show that ran from 1993 to 2002

Vehicles 
 XF series, a series of experimental aircraft
 DAF XF, a truck made by DAF Trucks
 Jaguar XF, a car made by Jaguar since 2008

Other uses 
 XF (grade), a letter grade used at some U.S. colleges, assigned to students who are caught performing acts of academic dishonesty
 XF lenses, for Fujifilm X-mount cameras
 Vladivostok Air (IATA airline code XF)
 Extra Fine, in numismatics, a designation of 40 or 45 points on the adapted Sheldon coin grading scale (can also be abbreviated as EF)
 XenForo, a commercial forum software package.